The 2003-04 season of the Divizia A Feminin was the 14th season of Romania's premier women's football league. CFF Clujana won the championship.

Standings

References

Rom
Fem
Romanian Superliga (women's football) seasons